St. Pauli Girl :beers are brewed and bottled by the St. Pauli Brauerei, which is located within the Beck's brewery in Bremen, Germany. However, in the US, it is manufactured in St. Louis, Missouri.

The brand is not named after the famous St. Pauli neighbourhood in Hamburg, which is home to one of the world's largest entertainment and red light districts. Rather, the name comes from the former  in Bremen, which was next to the original brewery established in 1857 by Lüder Rutenberg.

There are currently three brands of beer brewed: St. Pauli Girl Lager, St. Pauli Girl Special Dark and St. Pauli Non-Alcoholic Malt Beverage. The beer is only produced for export and is not sold in Germany.

The distinctive label depicting a woman wearing traditional outfits was introduced in the 19th century with the advent of the bottled beer. The local artist commissioned for the label drew his inspiration from the waitresses at the time.

St Pauli Girl's Beers were first introduced into select US markets in 1965. National Distribution began in 1975. St. Pauli Non-Alcoholic was first sold in the United States in 1991. The St Pauli Girl website claims that their beer is the number two selling German beer in the United States. Per the label on the bottle, it is a product of the US, brewed in St. Louis, MO.

St Pauli Girl spokesmodels

Since 1982, St. Pauli Girl Beer has chosen a model to represent the beer brand nationally each year and appear on the popular St. Pauli Girl poster.

1977 The first year of St Pauli Girls Spokesmodel campaign
1984 Gail Star Smith
1988 Jennifer Fabello
1989 Jennifer Fabello
1990 Felice Schachter
1991 Katie Vogt
1998 Teresa Politi
1999 Playboy magazine's Playmate of the month January 1999 Jaime Bergman
2000 Playboy magazine's Playmate of the month August 1998 Angela Little
2001 Playboy magazine's Playmate of the month March 1994 Neriah Davis
2002 Playboy magazine's Playmate of the month January 1998 Heather Kozar
2003 Playboy magazine's Playmate of the month July 1998 Lisa Dergan
2004 Icelandic model and actress Berglind Icey
2005 Playboy magazine's Playmate of the month February 1999 Stacy Fuson
2006 model Brittany Evans
2007 model and actress Bobbi Sue Luther
2008 Playboy magazine's Playmate of the month January 2001 Irina Voronina
2009 Slovak model Katarina Van Derham
2010 Katarina Van Derham
2011 American Model/Actress Jen England

References

Beer brands of Germany